Alien is a computer program that converts between different Linux package formats, created by Joey Hess and presently maintained by Kyle Barry.

Features
Alien supports conversion between Linux Standard Base (LSB), LSB-compliant .rpm packages, .deb, Stampede, Solaris and Slackware (.tgz, .txz) packages. It is also capable of automatically installing the generated packages, and can try to convert the installation scripts included in the archive as well. The latter feature should be used with caution since Linux distributions may vary significantly from one another, and using install scripts automatically converted from an Alien format may break the system.

Usage
A sample usage of Alien:

Terminal commands for Alien:

It might require Super User Privileges to run the command. If it does then proceed with the commands below

Similar applications
 CheckInstall, for the source tarball (i.e. Gentoo) to .deb (Debian).

See also

 Package management system

References

External links
 
 
 
 
 

Debian
Free software programmed in Perl
Free system software